Abid Hussain (26 December 1926 21 June 2012) was an Indian economist, civil servant and diplomat. He was India's ambassador to the United States of America from 1990 to 1992 and a member of the Planning Commission from 1985 to 1990.

Personal life
He was married to Trilok Karki, author of "Sino-Indian Conflict and International Politics in the Indian Sub-Continent", (1977) and had three children: Suhail Hasan, Vishaka Hussain, and Rana Hasan. His brother is the actor and mime artist Irshad Panjatan, who played in the German film Der Schuh des Manitu. Dr. Hussain grew up in his hometown Hyderabad, in Hyderabad State, where he studied at the Nizam College in 1942.

Career
He served as India's ambassador to the United States of America from 1990 to 1992. He also served as secretary in the Ministry of Commerce and Ministry of Heavy Industry as a member of the Indian Administrative Service. He was a Member of India's Planning Commission from 1985 to 1990.

As India's ambassador to the US and one of several prominent Muslim-Indian leaders, Hussain was a staunch defender of Israel and the Jewish people, who actively sought to convince Prime Minister PV Narsimha Rao that Israel would give the country a superior edge over Pakistan, and that an alliance with the Jewish state was indispensable to India's long-term interests.

Hussain was honoured in 1988 with the Padma Bhushan (awarded to recognise distinguished service of a high order to the nation) and has been at the forefront of India's economic and trade reforms since the 1980s. He chaired six important committees set up by the Government of India covering Trade Policy Reforms; Project Exports; CSIR Review Committee for Development of Science and Technology; Textile Policy of the Government of India; Development of Capital Market; and Small Scale Industry. Of these, the Abid Hussain Committee Report on Trade Policy Reform and the Abid Hussain Committee Report on Small Scale Industries have been regarded as milestones in India's economic reforms.

He was also president of Katha, chairman of Research Council of National Institute of Science, Technology & Development Studies (CSIR); India-China Economic & Cultural Council; Bhartiya Vidya Bhavan, NOIDA Kendra, member of the board of trustees of the Observer Research Foundation, member of the board of governors of Himgiri Zee University, Dehra Dun and several other cultural organisations.  He was a member of the Nehru Memorial Fund; the Asia Society, New York; Population Foundation of India; Foundation for Academic Excellence & Access; Administrative Staff College of India, Hyderabad; Shankar Lall Murli Dhar Memorial Society; and the Governing Council of Ranbaxy Science Foundation.

In addition, he was president of Lovraj Memorial Trust and a member of Academy of the Kingdom of Morocco and BP Koirala Foundation (Nepal).

Hussain was for nine years special rapporteur to UN on freedom of opinion and expression.  He was a member of the Constitution Review Commission set up by Government of India.  He was a member of the Prasar Bharati Board till April 2001.  Till recently Hussain was a member of the Council on Foreign Relations, New York.

During his long standing career he was U.N adviser on Turkey on community development for two years and also chief of industrial, technology, human settlements and environment in the UN Regional Commission of ESCAP, Bangkok for seven years. He has also been vice-chairman of Rajiv Gandhi Foundation, chancellor of Central University, Hyderabad, and trustee of the Indira Gandhi National Centre for the Arts Trust. Hussain presided over several national and international conferences and contributes papers on contemporary issues.

He was an active member of civil society and contributed to contemporary debates on a wide range of issues including globalisation, Internet censorship, gender issues, freedom of expression, and cultural relativism.

On 21 June 2012, Abid Hussain died in London due to a massive heart attack.

At the time of his death, Hussain was chancellor of English and Foreign Languages University, Hyderabad; chancellor of ICFAI Foundation for Higher Education, member on the board of trustees, of India Development Foundation of Overseas Indians (Ministry of External Affairs), member of International Panel on Democracy & Development of UNESCO; professor emeritus at Indian Institute of Foreign Trade; professor emeritus at the Foreign Service Institute of Ministry of External Affairs; chairman of Ghalib Academy and vice-president of Rumi Foundation.

Awards
Hussain was honoured with the Padma Bhushan in 1988 for meritorious services.

See also
 Syed Akbaruddin

References and notes

External links
 

1926 births
2012 deaths
20th-century Indian economists
20th-century Indian educational theorists
Ambassadors of India to the United States
Indian civil servants
Indian Shia Muslims
Osmania University alumni
Politicians from Hyderabad, India
Recipients of the Padma Bhushan in civil service
Scientists from Hyderabad, India